John Swinburne (4 July 1930 – 1 October 2017) was an American-born Scottish politician who was the founder and leader of the Scottish Senior Citizens Unity Party (SSCUP). He was that party's only ever representative in the Scottish Parliament, serving as a Member of the Scottish Parliament (MSP) for the Central Scotland region from 2003 until 2007.

Early life
Swinburne was born in Pennsylvania, United States. He was educated at Dalziel High School, Motherwell.

Political career
In 2003, he stood for election as the SSCUP candidate and gained a regional seat for Central Scotland.

Swinburne called for reintroduction of the 'Belt' or 'Tawse' into Scottish schools, expressing the opinion that corporal punishment would solve what he believed were endemic discipline problems. In 2006 his statement was condemned by other MSPs and by the teaching union, the EIS.

He stood for election again in the 2007 election but lost his seat, only polling 2% of the vote.

In May 2009, at age 78, Swinburne announced he was planning to stand for the UK Parliament in the 2009 Glasgow North East by-election. He later withdrew from this election, due to "unforeseen circumstances".

Outside politics
He became a director of Motherwell Football Club in 2000 and held this position until 2015.

He died on 1 October 2017.

References

External links 
 

1930 births
2017 deaths
Elder rights activists
Leaders of political parties in Scotland
Members of the Scottish Parliament 2003–2007
Pennsylvania politicians
People educated at Dalziel High School